Euseius tularensis is a species of mite in the family Phytoseiidae.

References

tularensis
Articles created by Qbugbot
Animals described in 1985